The following radio stations broadcast on AM frequency 990 kHz: 990 AM is a Canadian clear-channel frequency. CBW Winnipeg and CBY Corner Brook, Newfoundland and Labrador, share Class A status on 990 kHz.

Argentina
 LR4 Splendid in Buenos Aires
 LRH203 in Formosa
 LRJ201 in Barreal (San Juan)

Australia
 4RO in Rockhampton, Queensland

Canada
Stations in bold are clear-channel stations.

China
 BEB64 in Shanghai

Mexico
 XECL-AM in Mexicali, Baja California
 XECSAM-AM in Teziutlan, Puebla
 XEHZ-AM in La Paz, Baja California Sur
 XEIU-AM in Oaxaca, Oaxaca
 XET-AM in Monterrey, Nuevo León
 XETG-AM in Tuxtla Gutiérrez, Chiapas

Philippines
DZIQ in Makati

Singapore
 Capital 95.8FM (former AM frequency)

United Kingdom
 Greatest Hits West Midlands in Wolverhampton, West Midlands, England

United States

Venezuela
  in Caracas
  in Barquisimeto

References

Lists of radio stations by frequency